Defenders Day may refer to one of several public holidays:

Defenders Day (Maryland)
Defenders Day (Ukraine)
Defender of the Fatherland Day (Kazakhstan)
Defender of the Motherland Day (Uzbekistan)
Defender of the Fatherland Day (Russia)

See also
Defender of the Faith (disambiguation)